Ram Krishna Trivedi (1 January 1921 – 19 November 2015) was an Indian politician who was Governor of Gujarat from 26 February 1986 to 2 May 1990. Trivedi also served as Chief Election Commissioner of India from 18 June 1982 to 31 December 1985. He was a recipient of the third highest Indian civilian honour of the Padma Bhushan.

He was the first to introduce voter id cards in Indian Elections. He died in Lucknow in 2015.

References

External links 
 List of former CEC of India

Chief Election Commissioners of India
1921 births
2015 deaths
Recipients of the Padma Bhushan in public affairs